Hu Feng (November 2, 1902 – June 8, 1985) was a Chinese Marxist writer, poet and literary theorist. He was a prominent member of the League of Left-Wing Writers. After the founding of the People's Republic of China, Hu Feng became a member of the First National People's Congress of China, but was then heavily persecuted as the chief of the Hu Feng Counter-revolutionary Clique. The persecution became a massive political purge. He was first rehabilitated in 1980 and fully rehabilitated, posthumously, in 1988.

Life

Early life 
Hu Feng was born in Qichun, Hubei on November 2, 1902, as a son of a toufu artisan. He started school in his village in 1913 and entered middle school in Wuchang in 1920. He transferred to the High School Affiliated to the National Southeastern University (now High School Affiliated to Nanjing Normal University), which was also the school of Ba Jin. He joined Socialist Youth League of China there.

Education 
In 1925, Hu Feng participated in the May Thirtieth Movement, and entered Peking University later in the year. In 1926, he transferred to study western literature at Tsinghua University. Soon he quit school and returned to his hometown. He later served in the Kuomintang. In 1929, he entered Keio University in Japan to study English. Then, in 1933, he was evicted from Japan for organizing anti-Japanese groups among fellow Chinese students.

Literary activism 
Hu Feng returned to Shanghai in 1933 and became both the head of publicity and the executive secretary of the League of Left-Wing Writers. He became closely acquainted with Lu Xun. In 1934, he married Mei Zhi. In 1935, he secretly edited the journal Mu Xie Wen Cong (literally "The Sawdust Journal"), which was published with the help of Kanzō Uchiyama. In 1936, he co-founded and co-edited the journal The Petrel with others, which published the works of Lu Xun and other authors including Nie Gannu, Xiao Jun, and Wu Xiru.

After the Second Sino-Japanese War broke out in 1937, Hu Feng became the chief-editor of the magazine July. According to Ruth Y.Y. Hung, "Hu and his associate writers, the July poets, made paradigmatic distinctions between new and old, free verse and national forms, and, by extension, poetry-driven revolution... and poetry for the Revolution." Due to the war, Hu Feng moved the publication of July to Wuhan in October 1937, and to Chongqing in September 1938. Hu Feng stayed for a year in Guilin from March 1942 to March 1943, and returned to Chongqing after then. In 1945, Hu Feng became the chief-editor of the magazine Hope.

After the founding of the People's Republic of China in 1949, Hu Feng became a member of the China Federation of Literary and Art Circles, a member of the China Writers Association, and a member of the First National People's Congress of China. During this time, he wrote the poem Time Has Begun, which is a lengthy historical epic celebrating the founding of the PRC.

Political persecution 

Hu Feng's literary theory often conflicted with those of Chinese Communists such as Zhou Yang and of Mao Zedong, especially on the issue of "National Form". Ruth Y.Y. Hung observed that, "For Hu, any type of formulism in general, and traditional and popular national forms
specifically, derived from a Confucius 'ruling-class' ethic and had no prerogative
claim on New Poetry." In the 1940s and 1950s, Hu Feng's theory was criticized frequently.

In 1951, some wrote to Wen Yi Bao, requesting that it critique Hu Feng's literary theory again. In early 1952, Wen Yi Bao publicized these letters.

In July 1954, Hu Feng delivered a 300,000-word report, titled "Report on the Real Situation in Literature and Art Since Liberation", to the Politburo of the Chinese Communist Party. In January 1955, the Publicity Department of the Chinese Communist Party submitted a report to the Central Committee of the Chinese Communist Party (CCCPC) requesting that it criticize Hu Feng.

In early May 1955, Shu Wu submitted his correspondence with Hu Feng and other materials, accusing Hu of forming cliques. Mao wrote a foreword to Shu Wu's letters and materials and instructed People's Daily to publish them under the title "Certain Materials Regarding the Hu Feng Counter-revolutionary Clique".
On May 17, Hu Feng was arrested. He was detained at Qincheng Prison, and in 1965 he was sentenced to 14 years in prison. China claims that about 2,100 people were persecuted, 92 were arrested, and 72 were detained. Among them, 78 were confirmed as a member of the "Hu Feng Counter-revolutionary Clique", and 23 were regarded as key members.

During the Cultural Revolution, Hu Feng and his wife were sent to Lushan, Sichuan for labor. Hu Feng was again arrested in November 1967. In January 1970, Hu Feng was accused of desecrating the portrait of Mao and was sentenced for life.

Rehabilitation and death 
In 1979, Hu Feng was released from prison. In September 1980, he was partly rehabilitated when the CCCPC overturned its decision on the "Hu Feng Counter-revolutionary Clique", yet CCCPC did not overturn previous accusations towards Hu Feng. He was then made a standing member of the Chinese People's Political Consultative Conference and restored as a member of the China Federation of Literary and Art Circles and a member of the China Writers Association.

Hu Feng died of cancer in Beijing on June 8, 1985. China's Ministry of Public Security cancelled some of his accusations in April 1986, and CCCPC cancelled all accusations in June 1988.

Works and translations 
Besides his occupation as an editor, Hu Feng was also a translator and literary theorist. In 1935, Hu Feng translated Yang Kui's story  from Japanese into Chinese. He also translated some stories written in Japanese by authors from Taiwan and Korea, which are altogether published in the collection Shan Ling ("The Mountain Spirit") in April 1936.

Hu Feng published several theoretical works in the 1940s. In 1941, he published Lun Minzu Xingshi Wenti ("On National Forms"). In 1943, he published Minzu Zhanzheng Yu Wenyi Xingge ("The National War and the Disposition of Literature and Art"). In 1948, he published Lun Xianshizhuyi De Lu ("On the Road of Realism").

See also 
 Lu Xun
 Zhou Yang
 League of Left-Wing Writers
 Sufan movement

References

 Denton, Kirk A. The Problematic of Self in Modern Chinese Literature: Hu Feng and Lu Ling (Stanford University Press, 1998).
 Hung, Y.Y. Ruth, Hu Feng: A Marxist Intellectual in a Communist State, 1930–1955 (SUNY Press, 2020).
 Shu, Yunzhong, Buglers on the Home Front: The Wartime Practice of the Qiyue School (SUNY Press, 2000).
 Zhi, Mei, F: Hu Feng's Prison Years (Verso, 2013).

1902 births
1985 deaths
Chinese art critics
People from Huanggang
Republic of China writers
People's Republic of China writers
Writers from Hubei
Keio University alumni